Bathylagichthys is a species of deep-sea smelts.

Species
The six recognized species in this genus are:
 Bathylagichthys australis Kobyliansky, 1990 (southern deep-sea smelt)
 Bathylagichthys greyae Cohen, 1958 (Grey's deep-sea smelt)
 Bathylagichthys kobylianskyi Gon & A. L. Stewart, 2014  
 Bathylagichthys longipinnis Kobyliansky, 1985
 Bathylagichthys parini Kobyliansky, 1990
 Bathylagichthys problematicus Lloris & Rucabado, 1985

References

Bathylagidae